Robert Thomas (born February 18, 1991) is a former American football nose tackle. He was signed by the Washington Redskins as an undrafted free agent in 2014. He played college football for the University of Arkansas.

Professional career

Washington Redskins
Thomas was signed by the Washington Redskins on May 10, 2014, as an undrafted free agent. He was waived on August 30 for final roster cuts, but signed to the practice squad the following day. He was promoted to the active roster on September 25. Two days later, the Redskins waived him. The Redskins re-signed Thomas to their practice squad on September 30. He signed a futures contract on December 29.

On September 5, 2015, Thomas was waived for final roster cuts before the start of the regular season.

Seattle Seahawks
Thomas was signed to the Seattle Seahawks' practice squad on September 7, 2015. He was waived on November 11.

New England Patriots
The New England Patriots signed Thomas to their practice squad on November 12, 2015.

Miami Dolphins
On December 1, 2015, the Miami Dolphins signed Thomas off the Patriots' practice squad. He was placed on the team's injured reserve on December 8.

On April 28, 2016, Thomas was waived.

Carolina Panthers
On April 29, 2016, Thomas was claimed off waivers by the Carolina Panthers. On September 3, 2016, he was waived by the Panthers as part of final roster cuts.

New York Giants
On September 4, 2016, Thomas was claimed off waivers by the Giants. On October 16, he made his Giants debut against the Baltimore Ravens. On November 14, Thomas recorded his first career sack against the Cincinnati Bengals.

On February 14, 2017, Thomas signed a one-year contract with the Giants.

On September 1, 2018, Thomas was released by the Giants.

Buffalo Bills
On September 3, 2018, Thomas was signed to the Buffalo Bills' practice squad. He was promoted to the active roster on September 15, 2018. He was waived on October 3, 2018 and was re-signed back to the practice squad. He signed a reserve/future contract with the Bills on December 31, 2018.

On August 10, 2019, Thomas was placed on injured reserve with a knee injury. He was released on August 20.

References

External links
Arkansas Razorbacks bio
Washington Redskins bio
Seattle Seahawks bio

1991 births
Living people
African-American players of American football
Players of American football from Oklahoma
Sportspeople from Muskogee, Oklahoma
American football defensive tackles
Arkansas Razorbacks football players
Washington Redskins players
Seattle Seahawks players
New England Patriots players
Miami Dolphins players
Carolina Panthers players
New York Giants players
Buffalo Bills players
21st-century African-American sportspeople